Nicholas Audley, 3rd Baron Audley (c. 1328 – 1391) was born at Heighley Castle, Staffordshire, England to James Audley, 2nd Baron Audley, and was his only surviving son.

He was known as Lord of Rougemont (Redcastle, Shropshire) and was Marcher Lord of Kemes (as was his father), He was based at Heighley.

Nicholas's father-in-law Henry, 4th Earl of Buchan, received, amongst other large grants of manors and lands, a grant of the Lordship of the Isle of Man in 1310.

Later members of the Audley-Stanley family would become Kings of Mann.

Family
Nicholas married Elizabeth Beaumont, sister of John de Beaumont, 2nd Lord Beaumont, and daughter of Henry de Beaumont, 4th Earl of Buchan. He died without issue and the Barony was abeyant at his demise in 1391. It was revived however in 1408 for John Tuchet, grandson of Nicholas' sister Joan and her husband Sir John Tuchet (1327—1371). Although he had many disagreements with his father, he was nevertheless buried alongside his father's marble tomb in the quire of Hulton Abbey.

See also
Audley-Stanley family
Baron Audley
Abbey Hulton
Hawkstone Park history
Weston-under-Redcastle

References

External links 
  Madeley Village, Heighley castle history
  British History online - Hulton Abbey

1320s births
1391 deaths
03